Bangwinji (Bangjinge) is one of the Savanna languages of Gombe State, eastern Nigeria. Their ethnonym is Báŋjìŋèb (pl.; sg. form: Báŋjìŋè).

There are two dialects, Kaalɔ́  and Naabáŋ. Bangwinji had originally settled in Kaalɔ́  and Naabáŋ in the northern Muri Mountains, and have since moved down into the plains.

References

Waja languages
Languages of Nigeria